The 1991 Auburn Tigers football team represented Auburn University in the 1991 NCAA Division I-A football season.  Coached by Pat Dye, the team finished the season with a 5–6 record and ended their streak of 9 straight winning seasons.

Schedule

Roster

References

Auburn
Auburn Tigers football seasons
Auburn Tigers football